Cindy María Ramírez (born ) is a Colombian volleyball player. She is part of the Colombia women's national volleyball team. She competed among others at the 2005 Bolivarian Games, 2013 Bolivarian Games and in the 2015 FIVB World Grand Prix. On club level she played for Liga Vallecaucana in 2015.

References

External links
 FIVB Profile

1989 births
Living people
Colombian women's volleyball players
Place of birth missing (living people)
Middle blockers
21st-century Colombian women